Heinrich Uukkivi (10 May 1912 – 12 April 1943) was an Estonian association football, bandy and ice hockey player. He won the Estonian Football Championship five times, the Estonian Bandy Championship three times and the Estonian Ice Hockey Championship twice.

Internationally, Uukkivi made 46 appearances for the Estonia national football team since his debut in 1931, and scored 7 goals. He won the 1931 and the 1938 Baltic Cup with the team. He also made three appearances for the Estonia national bandy team and three appearances for the Estonia men's national ice hockey team.

In 1940, after Soviet occupation, Uukkivi was forcibly drafted into the Soviet Army and subsequently captured by the invading German forces. Later, he was released by the Soviet Army and sentenced to a prison camp, where he died.

Honours

Club

Football
Estonia
 Estonian Championship: 1934, 1935, 1936, 1937–38, 1938–39

Bandy
Kalev
 Estonian Championship: 1933, 1934

Dünamo
 Estonian Championship: 1941

Ice Hockey
Kalev
 Estonian Championship: 1933, 1937

Country

Football
Estonia
 Baltic Cup: 1931, 1938

References

1912 births
1943 deaths
People from Narva-Jõesuu
People from the Governorate of Estonia
Estonian footballers
Estonia international footballers
Estonian ice hockey players
Soviet military personnel of World War II
Estonian prisoners of war
World War II prisoners of war held by Germany
Estonian people who died in Soviet detention
People who died in the Gulag
Association football forwards